

Infantry 

1st Regiment Infantry U.S. Colored Troops
2nd Regiment Infantry U.S. Colored Troops
3rd Regiment Infantry U.S. Colored Troops
4th Regiment Infantry U.S. Colored Troops
5th Regiment Infantry U.S. Colored Troops – Formerly 127th Ohio Volunteer Infantry Regiment
6th Regiment Infantry U.S. Colored Troops
7th Regiment Infantry U.S. Colored Troops
8th Regiment Infantry U.S. Colored Troops
9th Regiment Infantry U.S. Colored Troops
10th Regiment Infantry U.S. Colored Troops
11th Regiment Infantry U.S. Colored Troops (Old)
11th Regiment Infantry U.S. Colored Troops (New)
12th Regiment Infantry U.S. Colored Troops
13th Regiment Infantry U.S. Colored Troops
14th Regiment Infantry U.S. Colored Troops
15th Regiment Infantry U.S. Colored Troops
16th Regiment Infantry U.S. Colored Troops
17th Regiment Infantry U.S. Colored Troops
18th Regiment Infantry U.S. Colored Troops
19th Regiment Infantry U.S. Colored Troops
20th Regiment Infantry U.S. Colored Troops
21st Regiment Infantry U.S. Colored Troops
22nd Regiment Infantry U.S. Colored Troops
23rd Regiment Infantry U.S. Colored Troops
24th Regiment Infantry U.S. Colored Troops
25th Regiment Infantry U.S. Colored Troops
26th Regiment Infantry U.S. Colored Troops
27th Regiment Infantry U.S. Colored Troops
28th Regiment Infantry U.S. Colored Troops
29th Regiment Infantry U.S. Colored Troops
30th Regiment Infantry U.S. Colored Troops
31st Regiment Infantry U.S. Colored Troops
32nd Regiment Infantry U.S. Colored Troops
33rd Regiment Infantry U.S. Colored Troops
34th Regiment Infantry U.S. Colored Troops
35th Regiment Infantry U.S. Colored Troops
36th Regiment Infantry U.S. Colored Troops
37th Regiment Infantry U.S. Colored Troops
38th Regiment Infantry U.S. Colored Troops
39th Regiment Infantry U.S. Colored Troops
40th Regiment Infantry U.S. Colored Troops
41st Regiment Infantry U.S. Colored Troops
42nd Regiment Infantry U.S. Colored Troops
43rd Regiment Infantry U.S. Colored Troops
44th Regiment Infantry U.S. Colored Troops
45th Regiment Infantry U.S. Colored Troops
46th Regiment Infantry U.S. Colored Troops
47th Regiment Infantry U.S. Colored Troops
48th Regiment Infantry U.S. Colored Troops
49th Regiment Infantry U.S. Colored Troops
50th Regiment Infantry U.S. Colored Troops
51st Regiment Infantry U.S. Colored Troops
52nd Regiment Infantry U.S. Colored Troops
53rd Regiment Infantry U.S. Colored Troops
54th Regiment Infantry U.S. Colored Troops
55th Regiment Infantry U.S. Colored Troops
56th Regiment Infantry U.S. Colored Troops
57th Regiment Infantry U.S. Colored Troops
58th Regiment Infantry U.S. Colored Troops
59th Regiment Infantry U.S. Colored Troops
60th Regiment Infantry U.S. Colored Troops
61st Regiment Infantry U.S. Colored Troops
62nd Regiment Infantry U.S. Colored Troops – Originally 1st Missouri Colored Infantry
63rd Regiment Infantry U.S. Colored Troops
64th Regiment Infantry U.S. Colored Troops
65th Regiment Infantry U.S. Colored Troops – Originally 2nd Missouri Colored Infantry
66th Regiment Infantry U.S. Colored Troops
67th Regiment Infantry U.S. Colored Troops – Originally 3rd Missouri Colored Infantry
68th Regiment Infantry U.S. Colored Troops – Originally 4th Missouri Colored Infantry
69th Regiment Infantry U.S. Colored Troops
70th Regiment Infantry U.S. Colored Troops
71st Regiment Infantry U.S. Colored Troops
72nd Regiment Infantry U.S. Colored Troops
73rd Regiment Infantry U.S. Colored Troops
74th Regiment Infantry U.S. Colored Troops
75th Regiment Infantry U.S. Colored Troops
76th Regiment Infantry U.S. Colored Troops
77th Regiment Infantry U.S. Colored Troops
78th Regiment Infantry U.S. Colored Troops
79th Regiment Infantry U.S. Colored Troops - 1st Kansas Colored Infantry
80th Regiment Infantry U.S. Colored Troops
81st Regiment Infantry U.S. Colored Troops
82nd Regiment Infantry U.S. Colored Troops
83rd Regiment Infantry U.S. Colored Troops - 2nd Kansas Colored Infantry
84th Regiment Infantry U.S. Colored Troops
85th Regiment Infantry U.S. Colored Troops
86th Regiment Infantry U.S. Colored Troops
87th Regiment Infantry U.S. Colored Troops
88th Regiment Infantry U.S. Colored Troops
89th Regiment Infantry U.S. Colored Troops
90th Regiment Infantry U.S. Colored Troops
91st Regiment Infantry U.S. Colored Troops
92nd Regiment Infantry U.S. Colored Troops
93rd Regiment Infantry U.S. Colored Troops
94th Regiment Infantry U.S. Colored Troops - Failed to complete organization.
95th Regiment Infantry U.S. Colored Troops
96th Regiment Infantry U.S. Colored Troops
97th Regiment Infantry U.S. Colored Troops
98th Regiment Infantry U.S. Colored Troops
99th Regiment Infantry U.S. Colored Troops
100th Regiment Infantry U.S. Colored Troops
101st Regiment Infantry U.S. Colored Troops
102nd Regiment Infantry U.S. Colored Troops
103rd Regiment Infantry U.S. Colored Troops
104th Regiment Infantry U.S. Colored Troops
105th Regiment Infantry U.S. Colored Troops - Failed to complete organization.
106th Regiment Infantry U.S. Colored Troops
107th Regiment Infantry U.S. Colored Troops
108th Regiment Infantry U.S. Colored Troops
109th Regiment Infantry U.S. Colored Troops
110th Regiment Infantry U.S. Colored Troops
111th Regiment Infantry U.S. Colored Troops
112th Regiment Infantry U.S. Colored Troops
113th Regiment Infantry U.S. Colored Troops
114th Regiment Infantry U.S. Colored Troops
115th Regiment Infantry U.S. Colored Troops
116th Regiment Infantry U.S. Colored Troops
117th Regiment Infantry U.S. Colored Troops
118th Regiment Infantry U.S. Colored Troops
119th Regiment Infantry U.S. Colored Troops
120th Regiment Infantry U.S. Colored Troops
121st Regiment Infantry U.S. Colored Troops
122nd Regiment Infantry U.S. Colored Troops
123rd Regiment Infantry U.S. Colored Troops
124th Regiment Infantry U.S. Colored Troops
125th Regiment Infantry U.S. Colored Troops
126th Regiment Infantry U.S. Colored Troops - Not organized.
127th Regiment Infantry U.S. Colored Troops
128th Regiment Infantry U.S. Colored Troops
135th Regiment Infantry U.S. Colored Troops
136th Regiment Infantry U.S. Colored Troops
137th Regiment Infantry U.S. Colored Troops
138th Regiment Infantry U.S. Colored Troops

Cavalry 
1st Regiment Cavalry U.S. Colored Troops
2nd Regiment Cavalry U.S. Colored Troops
3rd Regiment Cavalry U.S. Colored Troops
4th Regiment Cavalry U.S. Colored Troops
5th Regiment Cavalry U.S. Colored Troops
6th Regiment Cavalry U.S. Colored Troops

Artillery 
1st Regiment Heavy Artillery U.S. Colored Troops
2nd Regiment Light Artillery U.S. Colored Troops
2nd Regiment Heavy Artillery African Descent (changed to 4th Regiment U.S. Colored Heavy Artillery on April 26, 1864)
3rd Regiment Heavy Artillery U.S. Colored Troops   
4th Regiment Heavy Artillery U.S. Colored Troops  
5th Regiment Heavy Artillery U.S. Colored Troops (originally designated 9th Louisiana Infantry (African Descent) and 1st Mississippi Heavy Artillery (Colored))
6th Regiment Heavy Artillery U.S. Colored Troops (originally designated 1st Alabama Siege Artillery Regiment (Colored))
7th Regiment Heavy Artillery U.S. Colored Troops  
8th Regiment Heavy Artillery U.S. Colored Troops 
9th Regiment Heavy Artillery U.S. Colored Troops 
10th Regiment Heavy Artillery U.S. Colored Troops  
11th Regiment Heavy Artillery U.S. Colored Troops (originally designated 14th Rhode Island Heavy Artillery (Colored)) 
12th Regiment Heavy Artillery U.S. Colored Troops  
13th Regiment Heavy Artillery U.S. Colored Troops  
14th Regiment Heavy Artillery U.S. Colored Troops  
Independent Battery, United States Colored Light Artillery 
Unassigned United States Colored Heavy Artillery

See also 

List of American Civil War regiments by state
United States Colored Troops

References

External links 
8th U.S.C.T
35th U.S.C.T

African-American military units and formations of the American Civil War
Colored Troops
Civil War